Antonio Carlos Secchin is a Brazilian writer and academic. He was born in Rio de Janeiro on June 10, 1952, to Sives Secchin and Victoria Regia Fuzeira Secchin. Until the age of six, he lived in Cachoeiro de Itapemirim. Since 1959, he has lived in Rio de Janeiro.

He obtained a PhD from the Federal University of Rio de Janeiro in 1982. He has served as a professor of Brazilian literature at the universities of Bordeaux (1975-1979), Rome (1985), Rennes (1991), Mérida (1999), Paris III-Sorbonne Nouvelle (2009) and at the Faculty of Letters at UFRJ, where he was promoted in 1993 to the rank of full professor. In 2013, he became professor emeritus at UFRJ.

Literary awards
Secchin has won more than a dozen national awards, among them:
 first place in the Essay category from the National Book Institute (1983); 
 Sílvio Romero Award, from the Brazilian Academy of Letters, 1985, for João Cabral: a Poesia do Menos 
 Premio Alphonsus de Guimaraens Award, from the Fundação Biblioteca Nacional (2002)
 Poetry Award of the Brazilian Academy of Letters (2003)
 Prêmio Nacional do PEN Clube do Brasil (2003), for Todos os Ventos (best poetry book)  

Secchin is the seventh occupant of Chair No. 19 of the Brazilian Academy of Letters, to which he was elected on June 3, 2004, in succession to Marcos Almir Madeira. He was received on August 6, 2004 by academic Ivan Junqueira.

References

Brazilian writers
1952 births
Living people